The Smart Sex is a 1921 American silent comedy film directed by Fred LeRoy Granville and starring Eva Novak, Frank Braidwood and Margaret Mann.

Cast
 Eva Novak as Rose
 Frank Braidwood as Guy
 Geoffrey Webb as Fred
 Mayre Hall as Edith
 C. Norman Hammond as 	Mr. Vaughn
 Dorothy Hagan as Mrs. Vaughn
 Calvert Carter as Mr. Haskins
 Margaret Mann as Mrs. Haskins
 Jim O'Neill as Danny
 Evelyn McCoy as Dorothy

References

Bibliography
 Connelly, Robert B. The Silents: Silent Feature Films, 1910-36, Volume 40, Issue 2. December Press, 1998.
 Munden, Kenneth White. The American Film Institute Catalog of Motion Pictures Produced in the United States, Part 1. University of California Press, 1997.

External links
 

1921 films
1921 comedy films
1920s English-language films
American silent feature films
Silent American comedy films
Films directed by Fred LeRoy Granville
American black-and-white films
Universal Pictures films
1920s American films